The Naga Morich is a chili pepper grown in Northeast India and Bangladesh. There is no consensus on whether this is synonymous with the Bhut Jolokia, or a different variety. It is also one of the hottest known chilli peppers and the only naturally occurring chili pepper that measures 1 million SHU on Scoville scale.

Plant characteristics
Like many varieties of the Chinense species, the Naga Morich is a small-medium shrub with large leaves, small, five-petaled flowers, and blisteringly hot fruit. It differs to the Bhut Jolokia and Bih Jolokia in that it is slightly smaller with a pimply ribbed texture as opposed to the smoother flesh of the other two varieties.

Distribution
The Naga is a naturally occurring species in Bangladesh and North East India, more specifically in Nagaland, Manipur and Assam.

They are also grown in the United States, United Kingdom (as subspecies Dorset Naga) and Australia for the production of hot sauces, and in Finland, where it is mainly sold fresh in supermarkets.

Culinary usage
The Naga Morich chili is extremely hot, but has a flavor that is quite unique. Like the Bhut Jolokia (ghost pepper), it has a sweet and slightly tart flavor, followed by slight undertones of woody, smoky flavors. The chili is well suited for BBQ and grilling due to its unique flavor profile.

See also
 Scoville scale, a measurement of the pungency ("spicy heat") of a chili pepper.
 Pungency

References

Chili peppers
Capsicum cultivars